Brightmony House is an 18th-century manor house located south of Auldearn, Highland in Scotland. It is a Category A listed building

History
The property was in the Sutherland of Duffus family in the 15th century. The 18th century house was built by Alexander Brodie of Lethen in 1732.

Notes

References

Category A listed buildings in Highland (council area)
Clan Sutherland